Pao barbatus is a species of freshwater pufferfish found in the Mekong River in southeast Asia.

It is closely related to Tetraodon (Pao) cambodgiensis and was generally considered a junior synonym of that species until 2013. In the same year its species group was moved from the genus Tetraodon to Pao.

References

Tetraodontidae
Fish described in 1998
Fish of the Mekong Basin